Vasileios Panaritis of Konstantinos (Molaoi, 1924 – 22 June 2004) was a Greek lawyer and politician, who acted as MP for Laconia after the metapolitefsi.

Biography 
He was born in Molaoi. He studied law. He was elected MP for Laconia for the first time in the 1974 Greek legislative election with the support of New Democracy with 11,857 preference crosses.  He was reelected MP with ND in 1977.

He died on 22 June 2004 and buried the next day in the holy church of the Birth of Christ in Molaoi.

References 

People from Molaoi
1924 births
2004 deaths
Greek MPs 1974–1977
Greek MPs 1977–1981